The Bridewell was a municipal prison built in 1768 on the site now occupied by City Hall Park in the Civic Center neighborhood of Manhattan, New York City.

History 
According to the Oxford English Dictionary, Bridewell is a common English noun referred both to a gaol in which prisoners were held, or a workhouse to which they were confined.  The term was used for a number of jails in the Thirteen Colonies.

Construction on the New York City Bridewell began in 1768, although the building was not completed until after the end of the American Revolutionary War. Even though it was incomplete, the British used the jail to house prisoners of war during the Revolutionary War. Prior to British control of New York, the jail in 1776 housed Thomas Hickey prior to his execution in the plot to assassinate George Washington.

It stood until it was replaced by The Tombs in 1838; some of the dressed stone blocks from the Bridewell were used to construct The Tombs.

References

Jails in New York City
1768 establishments in the Province of New York
Government buildings in Manhattan
Demolished buildings and structures in Manhattan
Buildings and structures completed in 1768
Civic Center, Manhattan
Buildings and structures demolished in 1838
Prisons in New York City